Rafael Gandarillas (born 9 sept 1968) is a Puerto Rican former swimmer who competed in the 1984 Summer Olympics.

References

1968 births
Living people
Puerto Rican male swimmers
Puerto Rican male freestyle swimmers
Olympic swimmers of Puerto Rico
Swimmers at the 1984 Summer Olympics
20th-century Puerto Rican people
21st-century Puerto Rican people